Politics of El Salvador takes place in a framework of a presidential representative democratic republic, whereby the President of El Salvador is both head of state and head of government, and of an executive power is exercised by the government. Legislative power is vested in both the government and the Legislative Assembly. The Judiciary is independent of the executive and the legislature.

Political culture 

El Salvador has a multi-party system. Three political parties Nuevas Ideas (New Ideas), the Nationalist Republican Alliance (ARENA) and the Farabundo Martí National Liberation Front (FMLN) have tended to dominate elections since the end of the civil war. ARENA candidates won four consecutive presidential elections until the election of Mauricio Funes of the FMLN in March 2009. In 2014, he was followed by another FMLN president, Salvador Sánchez Cerén.

The 2019 election was won by Nayib Bukele as the candidate of the center-right Grand Alliance for National Unity (GANA) party. In February 2021, El Salvador's legislative election was an important breakthrough. The new party, founded by President Bukele, Nuevas Ideas, won around two-thirds of votes with its allies (GANA-New Ideas). His party won supermajority 56 seats in the 84-seat parliament. Bukele became the country’s most powerful leader in three decades.

Geographically, the departments of the Central region, especially the capital and the coastal regions, known as departamentos rojos, or red departments, are mostly left-wing while the departamentos azules, or blue departments, in the east, western and highland regions are generally conservative.

Executive branch 

|President
|Nayib Bukele
|Nuevas Ideas
|1 June 2019
|}
El Salvador elects its head of state, the President of El Salvador, directly through a fixed-date general election whose winner is decided by absolute majority.  If an absolute majority is not achieved by any candidate in the first round of a presidential election, then a run-off pool election is conducted 30 days later between the two candidates who obtained the most votes in the first round. The president serves a five-year term. He is barred from immediately succeeding himself, though previously elected presidents may run for a second, non-consecutive term.

In September 2021, El Salvador's Supreme Court decided to allow President Nayib Bukele to run for a second term in 2024, despite the constitution prohibits the president to serve two consecutive terms in office. The decision was organized by judges appointed to the court by President Bukele.

Legislative branch

Salvadorans also elect a single-chamber, unicameral national legislature, the Legislative Assembly of El Salvador, of 84 members (deputies) elected by closed-list proportional representation for three-year terms, with the possibility of immediate re-election. 20 of the 84 seats in the Legislative Assembly are elected on the basis of a single national constituency. The remaining 64 are elected in 14 multi-member constituencies (corresponding to El Salvador's 14 departments). They range from 3-16 seats each according to departmental population size.

Judicial branch

The Judiciary, headed by the Supreme Court, is composed of 15 judges, one of them being elected as President of the Judiciary.

Foreign relations 

El Salvador is a member of the United Nations and several of its specialized agencies, the Organization of American States (OAS), the Central American Common Market (CACM), the Central American Parliament (PARLACEN), and the Central American Integration System (SICA). It actively participates in the Central American Security Commission (CASC), which seeks to promote regional arms control.

El Salvador also is a member of the World Trade Organization and is pursuing regional free trade agreements. An active participant in the Summit of the Americas process, El Salvador chairs a working group on market access under the Free Trade Area of the Americas initiative.

References

External links
Legislative Assembly of El Salvador 
Presidency of El Salvador
Supreme Court of Justice of El Salvador
Changing Colors in El Salvador by Emma Vawter, The Yale Globalist, May 11, 2009